Olin is an unincorporated community in Hamilton County, in the U.S. state of Texas. According to the Handbook of Texas, the community had a population of 12 in 2000.

History
The area in what is known as Olin today was founded in 1890. A post office was established at Olin in 1898 and remained in operation until 1908. It was run by Louis D. Gordon in his barbershop. Mail was then sent from Hico and was delivered on horseback. From 1900 to 1910, Olin had a telephone exchange, a store, a cotton gin, and two churches. Its population was 40 from 1950 to 1965 and had two businesses and one church in 1954. Both businesses closed in 1965. The population went down to 12 from 1970 through 2000. There was only one church and one business in Olin in the late-1980s.

Geography

Education
Olin had a school at the start of the 20th century, which burned to the ground in 1938. Students were then sent to school in either Hamilton, Carlton, or Hico. Today the community is served by the Hico Independent School District.

References

Unincorporated communities in Hamilton County, Texas
Unincorporated communities in Texas